Bhuji/Bhujee is ward number 7 of the seven total ward numbers of Umakunda Rural Municipality/उमाकुण्ड गाउँपालिका then village development committee in Ramechhap District in the Janakpur Zone of north-eastern Nepal. At the time of the 1991 Nepal census it had a population of 2,285 people living in 450 individual households.

Around 80 percent of people are Sunuwar/सुऩुवाऱ/मुखीय in Bhuji. They depend on agriculture and some of them work in the British Army (BGA); Indian Army (IGA); Gurkha Contingent Singapore Police Force (GCSPF) and in Gulf countries.
 
In Bhuji there is one Kasthem Secondary School, which is up to 10 class SEE then SLC; two primary level schools named as (Thinkepu Ni.Ma.Bi and Dilkharka Ni.Ma.Bi) and one Thinkepu pre-primay school.

'Bhujee Health Post' Centre is the area's major Health Centre and is located at Poldim, Bhuji.

The administrative office of the ward is located at Koldanda, Bhuji.

Bhuji has its own stories and legends to be heard but recently it has gained its popularity due to the football tournament known by Bhujee League, which was started in the year 2055 BS (1998 AD) by different name then aiming to entertain the locals through the small competition of football.  Due to nation's unstable political situations and other factors the competition didn't take place in some of the years in between 2055 BS (1998 AD) to 2067 BS (2010 AD). In 2068 BS (2011 AD) the competition was renamed as Bhujee League, and it has been run successfully and continuously every year in between the gap time of Nepalese Biggest festival Dashain and Tihar time. And now the competition has gained the popularity and which has not only managed to attract the players from different villages from the surroundings but also many players, teams from the capital city and other cities too. Locals, business people and entrepreneurs have been benefited by the Bhujee League smoothly.

References

External links
UN map of the municipalities of Ramechhap District

Populated places in Ramechhap District